Parteš (Serbian Cyrillic: Партеш) or Partesh, is a town and municipality located in the Gjilan District of Kosovo. The municipality was established on 19 August 2010. It is inhabited by Serbs, and as of 2013, it has an estimated population of 5,300 inhabitants.

Settlements
The municipality consists of town of Parteš and two villages: Pasjane and Donja Budriga.

Culture
The settlements of Parteš, Donja Budriga and Pasjane are inhabited by ethnic Serbs. There are four Serbian Orthodox churches within the municipality. There are pilgrimage sites at medieval religious ruins.

Economy
The economy is based mainly on dairy production and small trade.

Education
There are two primary schools and five secondary schools within the municipality.

Demographics
The municipality of Parteš is inhabited by ethnic Serbs. The ECMI calculated, based on 2010 and 2013 estimations, that the Parteš municipality was inhabited by 5,300 Serbs (99.96%).

According to the 2011 census, which is unreliable due to partial boycott by Serbs and other minorities, the settlement of Parteš alone had 478 residents, all of whom were Serbs (100%); the Parteš municipality had 1,787 residents, 1,785 of whom were Serbs (99.9%). The municipality of Parteš includes the town and two villages. It is one of the Serbian enclaves in Kosovo (located outside Serb-inhabited North Kosovo), alongside five other municipalities: Gračanica, Štrpce, Novo Brdo, Ranilug and Klokot.

Politics
The municipality in planned to be included in the Community of Serb Municipalities, according to the 2013 Brussels Agreement.

The 2013 local elections, held in November, saw 2,770 voters, 63.8% of the total number of registered voters in the Parteš municipality (4,342) according to the last elections. The elections saw the following results in the local government, the municipal assembly which has 15 seats:

Independent Liberal Party (SLS), 37.60%—6 seats
Citizens' Initiative Srpska (GIS), 18.20%—3 seats
Democratic Initiative (DI), 13.04%—2 seats
People's Initiative (NI), 12.57%—2 seats
Serb Citizens' Initiative Pasjane (SGI P), 6.02%—1 seat
Serb Citizens' Initiative Donja Budriga (SGI DB), 6.02%—1 seat

Notes
Notes

See also
Municipalities of Kosovo
Cities and towns in Kosovo
Populated places in Kosovo

References

Sources

External links

 
 Parteš Municipality

Populated places in Kosovo
Municipalities of Kosovo
Community of Serb Municipalities
Serbian enclaves in Kosovo